The Argentina women's national football team represents Argentina in international women's football. Like their men's counterpart, the women's team has been known or nicknamed as "La Albiceleste (The White and Sky-Blues)".

Women's football in Argentina remains largely in the shadow of the men in terms of play development and fan support; in women's sports in Argentina, field hockey and volleyball are also more popular. Almost all its members were amateur players until 1991 when the Campeonato de Fútbol Femenino was founded to increase football popularity among women in Argentina.

The Argentina–Brazil football rivalry in women's football cannot be compared to that of men given the big differences between both countries; Brazil has the clear advantage in matches between them, and has been hosting a competitive professional women's league for many years, while Argentina recently introduced it in 2019.

History
The team played its first match against Chile on 3 December 1993, which ended in a 3–2 defeat. Two years later, Argentina got its biggest win over Bolivia, winning 12–0 in a 1995 South American Women's Football Championship match played at Estádio Parque do Sabiá. Argentina reached the final of that tournament, losing to Brazil 2–0.

The team reached the final of the 1998 South American Women's Football Championship, losing to Brazil again, this time 7–1 in Mar del Plata. In the semi-finals, they beat Peru on penalties 4–3 in dramatic fashion, with the scores at 1–1 after extra time.

In the 2003 Pan American Games, the team reached the semi-finals, where Brazil won 2–1 in a tight match. In the Bronze Medal match, Argentina lost 4–1 to Mexico, and finished in fourth place. Despite a lack of investment and interest, the women's national team played its first World Cup in 2003. They were drawn in a group with Japan, Canada, and Germany; Argentina lost all three matches and scored only once.

After their world cup debut, the team went unbeaten for 14 matches from 2005 until 2007, including throughout the 2006 South American Cup, where they beat Brazil in the final 2–0 to become champions. Their run ended when they lost a friendly with China 1–0 in June 2007. Three days later it got revenge though, and beat China by the same score. Since the team won the South American Cup, there were high expectations for the 2007 World Cup, played in China. However, the squad lost all matches again, including a record 0–11 loss to Germany.

With the 2006 South American Cup title, the team qualified for the 2008 Summer Olympics, their Olympic debut. Argentina finished last with no points and only one goal in favor, although less goals were conceded than in the World Cup the previous year.

The team returned to play in the 2014 South American Games, with new coach Luis Nicosia, losing the opening match against Chile 1–0, but winning against Bolivia 4–0 and advancing to the semi-finals, where they won against rivals Brazil on penalties after a 0–0 draw. In the final, they won the gold medal with a 2–1 victory against Chile, which meant they won their first tournament since the 2006 South American Cup.

In the 2014 Copa América Femenina, the team finished second in their group, behind Brazil, with three wins and one loss, and qualified for the Final Stage. The top two teams in the final stage qualified for the 2015 Women's World Cup and 2016 Summer Olympics, and the third-placed team qualified for a CONCACAF-CONMEBOL playoff for World Cup qualification. Argentina finished last in the final stage and missed out on the World Cup and Olympics.

In 2016 the team "effectively" did not exist, as the officials were more interested in investing in the men's side. Following a long struggle to demand for better treatment, the team was restarted in 2017 and its former coach Carlos Borrello was reappointed as coach of the side.

In 2018, Argentina finished third at the Copa América which qualified them for the CONCACAF–CONMEBOL play-off. Argentina defeated the fourth-place finisher from the CONCACAF Championship, Panama, in a two-legged play-off in November 2018 to qualify for the 2019 FIFA Women's World Cup. In the team's debut, they managed a shocking 0–0 draw to Japan, former champions of 2011 FIFA Women's World Cup, and gained its first ever point in any Women's World Cup. The next match was a narrow 1–0 loss to England, and then an exciting 3–3 draw to Scotland, after being down 3–0 with 25 minutes left. Although Argentina didn't qualify to the knockout stages, they put in a good performance, with two draws and one loss, finishing the tournament in the group's third place. The women's team's performance was deemed to be one of the country's watershed moment for the long neglected women's side, especially after the disappointing shows of the Argentine men's side in the 2018 FIFA World Cup and 2019 Copa América.

Results and fixtures

The following is a list of recent match results, as well as any future matches that have been scheduled.

Legend

2022

2023

Argentina Results and Fixtures – Soccerway.com

Head-to-head record

Coaching staff

Current coaching staff

As of July 2021

Manager history

 Carlos Borrello (1998–2012)
 Luis Nicosia (201?–201?)
 Julio Olarticoechea (201?–201?)
 Carlos Borrello (2017–2021)
 Germán Portanova (2021–)

Players

Current squad
 The following players were called up for the friendly home match against Chile on 10 April 2022.
 Caps and goals accurate up to and including 23 March 2021.

Recent call-ups
 The following players have been called up in the last 12 months.

Captains

Eva González (2006–2010)
Fabiana Vallejos (2014)
Florencia Bonsegundo (2018–2019)
Estefanía Banini (2019–2022)
Vanina Correa (2022–)

Records

 Active players in bold, statistics correct as of 20 April 2021.

Most capped players

Top goalscorers

Competitive record
 Champions   Runners-up   Third place   Fourth place

FIFA Women's World Cup

Olympic Games

CONMEBOL Copa América Femenina

Pan American Games

South American Games

SheBelieves Cup
The SheBelieves Cup is a global invitational tournament for national teams in women's football hosted in the United States.

See also
 Sport in Argentina
 Football in Argentina
 Women's football in Argentina
 Argentina women's national under-20 football team
 Argentina women's national under-17 football team
 Argentina–Brazil football rivalry

References

External links

  
 FIFA profile, FIFA.com 

 
South American women's national association football teams